Baquet may refer to:

People
 Achille Baquet, (1885–c.1956) American jazz clarinetist
 Camille Baquet, (1842–1924) American civil-war officer
 Charles R. Baquet, III (born 1941), American Career Foreign Service Officer
 Danielle Baquet-Long (1982–2009), American musician
 Dean Baquet (born 1956), American journalist
 Edward Baquet (died 1993), American restaurateur and civil rights activist
 George Baquet, (1881–1949) American jazz clarinetist
 Harold Baquet (1958–2015), American photographer
 Maurice Baquet (1911–2005), French actor and cellist

Other uses
 Baquet (car body style), a style of touring car
 A medical treatment developed by Franz Mesmer

See also
 
 Bouquet (disambiguation)
 Banquet (disambiguation)